Inbraak   is a 1942 Dutch film directed by Alfred Mazure. It was based on his own comic strip Dick Bos  and the first cinematic adaptation of this popular series.

Cast
 - Dick Bos
Alfred Mazure
Piet van der Ham

Sources

1942 films
Dutch crime films
Films based on Dutch comics
Live-action films based on comics
Films set in the Netherlands
Films shot in the Netherlands
Dutch black-and-white films